The Church of St Leonard in Rodney Stoke, Somerset, England, was built around 1175 and is a Grade I listed building.

The interior of the church contains a screen, bearing the date 1624, the gift of Sir Edward Rodney, which includes a representation of the martyrdom of St Erasmus, who was killed by having his entrails removed.

The church underwent Victorian restoration in the 1870s when a slow combustion stove was installed in a pit in the floor.

The parish is part of the Rodney Stoke with Draycott benefice which is within the Axbridge deanery.

Burials
 Sir Edward Rodney (1590–1657)
 Frances Rodney (d. 1659)

See also
 Grade I listed buildings in Mendip
 List of ecclesiastical parishes in the Diocese of Bath and Wells
 List of Somerset towers

References

External links
Church website
Church Art & History website

12th-century church buildings in England
Grade I listed churches in Somerset
Church of England church buildings in Mendip District
Grade I listed buildings in Mendip District